Pointes et aiguille de l'Épéna is a mountain of Savoie, France. It lies in the Massif de la Vanoise range. It has an elevation of 3,421 metres above sea level.

Mountains of the Alps
Alpine three-thousanders
Mountains of Savoie